King Creole is a 1958 American musical drama film directed by Michael Curtiz and based on the 1952 novel A Stone for Danny Fisher by Harold Robbins. Produced by Hal B. Wallis, the film stars Elvis Presley, Carolyn Jones, Walter Matthau, Dolores Hart, Dean Jagger, and Vic Morrow, and follows a nineteen-year-old (Presley) who gets mixed up with crooks and involved with two women.

Presley later indicated that of all the characters he portrayed throughout his acting career, the role of Danny Fisher in King Creole was his favorite. To make the film, Presley was granted a 60-day deferment from January to March 1958 for beginning his military service. Location shooting in New Orleans was delayed several times by crowds of fans attracted by the stars, particularly Presley.

The film was released on July 2, 1958 by Paramount Pictures to critical and commercial success. Many critics were unanimous in their praise of Presley's performance, and the film peaked at number five on the Variety box office earnings charts. The soundtrack song "Hard Headed Woman" reached number one on the Billboard singles chart and number two on the R&B chart, and was certified gold by the Recording Industry Association of America (RIAA), while the soundtrack album peaked at number two on the Billboard chart.

Plot
Nineteen-year-old high school student Danny Fisher (Presley) works before and after school to support his surviving family: his father (Dean Jagger) and sister Mimi (Jan Shepard). After Danny's mother died, his grieving father lost his job as a pharmacist, and moved his impoverished family to the French Quarter in New Orleans.

At work one morning, Danny rescues Ronnie (Jones) from her abusive date. After a taxi ride to Danny's high school, Ronnie kisses him. Danny responds to witnessing schoolmates' teasing by kissing Ronnie back and then punching one of them in the face when he makes a teasing remark. Danny is summoned, where Miss Pearson (Helene Hatch), his teacher, tells Principal Evans (Raymond Bailey) that Danny will not graduate because of his poor attitude. Mr. Evans is sympathetic, but powerless to help, so Danny decides to drop out of school to find work, against the wishes of his father, who tries to convince Danny to stay in school.

When Danny leaves the school grounds, three young men lure him into an alley. Their leader, Shark (Vic Morrow), wants revenge for Danny hitting the teasing student at school, who turned out to be his brother. Danny defends himself so well that it impresses Shark, so Shark invites Danny to join his gang. Shark then has Danny to help the gang shoplift at a five-and-dime by singing "Lover Doll" to distract the customers and staff.

Only Nellie (Dolores Hart), who works the snack bar, notices Danny's complicity in the theft, but she does not turn him in.

Later that night, Danny meets Ronnie again at The Blue Shade nightclub, where Danny is now employed. At first, she pretends not to know him, as she is accompanied by her boyfriend and the club's owner, Maxie Fields, aka "The Pig" (Matthau). When Maxie does not believe her, she claims she heard Danny sing once. Maxie insists that Danny prove he can sing. His rendition of "Trouble" impresses Charlie LeGrand (Paul Stewart), the honest owner of the King Creole nightclub, the only nightspot in the area not owned by Maxie.  Impressed, LeGrand offers Danny a job as a singer at his club.

After leaving the club Danny meets up with the Shark gang for his share of the nightly take, but their leader, Shark only gives dummy five and Danny takes the money back from Shark and give it to Dummy, resulting Shark reannounce that Danny is out of the Shark gang and calling him "Trouble" and walks away. He then makes his way to the five and dime at closing time to see Nellie. Danny invites Nellie to a fictitious party in a hotel room.  Finding nobody else there, Nellie starts crying in fear and leaves after admitting that she still wants to see Danny again, but not under those conditions.

Meanwhile, Mr. Fisher finds employment as a pharmacist in a local drug store, but his boss, Mr. Primont (Gavin Gordon)—who reluctantly hired Mr. Fisher after his boss made him do so—constantly demeans Mr. Fisher out of retaliation, much to Danny's embarrassment. That situation makes it easier for Danny to go against his father's wishes and accept Charlie's job offer. When Danny becomes a hit at the King Creole, Maxie tries to hire him. Danny declines his offer out of loyalty to Charlie.

Shark, now working for Maxie, suggests to Danny they beat up Primont to help his father. One night when Mr. Fisher leaves the store dressed in Primont's hat and coat (lent due to a rainstorm), Shark recognizes him, but decides to mug him anyway, as that would be even better for Maxie's purposes. Danny's father is so badly injured that he needs expensive surgery, so Maxie pays for a specialist to perform it. Maxie later blackmails Danny into signing with him by threatening to tell his father about his involvement in the mugging, and then does it anyway. Outraged, Danny pummels Maxie for the betrayal,  deceit and treachery and helps Ronnie escape him.

Maxie sends his henchmen after Danny. Shark and another gang member trap him in an alley. Danny knocks out one of his pursuers. Then Shark stabs Danny, but kills himself in the struggle. Ronnie finds a profusely bleeding Danny and takes him to her house on a bayou to recover. She asks him to forget her sordid past and to love her, even only for a short time. Danny replies that it would not be difficult to love her and kisses her. Maxie drives up, accompanied by Dummy (Jack Grinnage), a member of Danny's former gang. Maxie fatally shoots Ronnie. Dummy, who had been befriended by Danny, grapples with Maxie.  The gun goes off, killing its owner.

Danny returns to the King Creole, still mourning Ronnie. Nellie promises to wait for him. Then at the club he sings a sad song with the lines "Let's think of the future, forget the past, you're not my first love, but you're my last". Mr Fisher also shows up to listen to his son sing.

Cast

 Elvis Presley as Danny Fisher
 Carolyn Jones as Ronnie, Maxie's mistress
 Walter Matthau as Maxie Fields, the local gangster
 Dolores Hart as Nellie, a five-and-dime employee who falls for Danny
 Dean Jagger as Mr. Fisher, Danny's father
 Liliane Montevecchi as Forty Nina, a stripper at the King Creole nightclub
 Vic Morrow as Shark, Maxie's lead thug
 Paul Stewart as Charlie LeGrand, owner of the King Creole
 Jan Shepard as Mimi Fisher, Danny's sister
 Brian G. Hutton as Sal, a member of Shark's gang.
 Jack Grinnage as Dummy, a mute member of Shark's gang.
 Dick Winslow as Eddie Burton
 Raymond Bailey as Mr. Evans, the school principal
 Gavin Gordon as Mr. Primont, drug store manager and Mr. Fisher's overbearing boss

Production
Hal Wallis acquired the rights to A Stone for Danny Fisher in February 1955 for $25,000, with the intention of giving the lead role of a New York boxer to either James Dean or Ben Gazzara. The role was originally written for Dean, but the project was cancelled after his death in 1955. In January 1957, following the success of an off-Broadway stage version of the story, Presley was suggested as a possible replacement. After negotiations were completed, the character of Fisher was changed from a boxer to a singer and the location was moved from New York to New Orleans.

Wallis selected Michael Curtiz, a noted director of the Hollywood studio system whose works included The Adventures of Robin Hood, Yankee Doodle Dandy and Casablanca. Curtiz decided to shoot the film in black and white for dramatic ambiance and to give the streets a film noir appearance. He also selected an experienced cast to support Presley, including Walther Matthau and Carolyn Jones, as well as Dolores Hart, Presley's co-star in the 1957 film Loving You.  Curtiz instructed a "taken aback" Presley to lose fifteen pounds and shave his sideburns for the role, both of which Presley did.

On December 20, 1957, a month before filming was due to begin, Presley received his draft notice. Presley and Paramount had to request special permission to defer Presley's enlistment to allow him to finish the film. Both pointed out to the draft board that a delay in filming would cost them a large sum of money invested in the pre-production of the film. On December 27, Presley received a 60-day deferment.

Filming took place between January 20 and March 10, 1958, mostly at Paramount Studios in Los Angeles, California, and on location in the French Quarter in New Orleans, Louisiana, while the scene of the bayou was filmed at Lake Pontchartrain. During filming, Presley was constantly moved to avoid the crowds of fans who came to see him on location, which delayed the film-making. Wallis had rented a house for Presley's privacy, and a second one after one of his assistants noticed that the back of the houses in the block led to the back of the houses on the adjacent street. To escape from the crowds, Presley would climb to the roof of one house and cross over onto the roof of the other.  After a fan discovered his path, he resided on the tenth floor of the Beverly Wilshire Hotel, which was rented for the whole cast.

Before filming began, Curtiz was convinced that Presley would be a "conceited boy", but after a few weeks of working together, he described Presley as a "lovely boy" who would go on to be a "wonderful actor". Presley, after seeing an early copy of the finished film, thanked Curtiz for giving him the opportunity to show his potential as an actor; he would later cite Danny Fisher as his favorite role of his acting career. Fourteen days after the completion of King Creole, Presley was officially inducted into the U.S. Army.

Reception

The film was first shown at Loew's State Theater in New York City on July 2, 1958.  During the opening week, it ranked number five in box office earnings on the Variety national survey. The film received critical acclaim.

During the May of 1959 Mexican premiere at Américas Cinema in Mexico City, a riot started when according to the local newspapers 600 teenagers broke into the theater without paying the admission fee. The crowd occupied the balcony area and destroyed the seats, while they threw lit papers and debris to the attendants. As some women tried to leave the premises, they were stripped by the rioters. The group was reported to be a mixture of university students and other locals that joined. The anti-riot police arrived to the scene where they scattered the crowd, while no arrests were made. Writer Parménides García Saldaña later recounted the incident on his article "El Rey Criollo", in which he detailed the presence of gangs and their harassment of the women in attendance.

Critical reception
Billboard wrote:

Elvis Presley's new film shapes up as a box-office winner. It's got plenty of action and characterisation and the star gives his best acting performance to date ... (the) Incidents and characters of the original novel are distorted, but the plot stands up well and the dialog is salty and emotion-packed. As Danny, Presley exhibits improved histrionics and provides many moving and tense moments. Carolyn Jones is a knockout as a fallen thrush who would like to love him; their aborted romance gives the pic its finest scenes.

Variety declared that the film "Shows the young star [Presley] as a better than fair actor". Howard Thompson of The New York Times also gave a favorable review:

Mr. Curtiz and his players have got it snugly draped around Mr. Presley's shoulders. And there it stays, until a limp melodramatic home stretch, even with eight or so of those twitching, gyrating musical interludes. ... These also perfectly typify the Bourbon Street honky-tonks that Mr. Curtiz and his fine photographer, Russ Harlan, have beguilingly drenched with atmosphere. Matching, or balancing, the tunes are at least seven characterizations that supply the real backbone and tell the story of the picture. ... for Mr. Presley, in his third screen attempt, it's a pleasure to find him up to a little more than Bourbon Street shoutin' and wigglin'. Acting is his assignment in this shrewdly upholstered showcase, and he does it, so help us over a picket fence.

The Spectator, however, criticized the relationship of Presley's character with his love interests:

The girls in his (Michael Curtiz's) latest film, King Creole, are both played by good, serious actresses: Carolyn Jones .. and Dolores Hart, ... both are shown to be hungrily, desperately, unpridefully in love with him (Presley's character). They have no existence, except in him; do nothing but wait for him; hope for nothing but a little rough affection ... Instead of being kissed, they beg for kisses, which Mr. Presley sulkily and reluctantly hands out now and then, with the air of a small, fastidious boy being press to eat marshmallow and, though he feels a bit sick not quite knowing how to get out of it ... (it) really seems to suggest this is a god come down among us for a spell; and when tender and infinitely patient in spite of the long past of infidelity, nonchalance, and what looks to an observer like plain indifference from him, her lips poised for the kiss that doesn't come ... As the most extreme example of a contemporary idol, Mr. Presley is pretty fascinating, and, though you may be put off at first by his pale, puffy, bruised looking babyish face, by the weary cherubic decadence you might imagine in Nero, and the excessive greasiness of his excessively long, spiky locks, his films, however bad (and King Creole is pretty low on his list), are well worth taking a look at.

About Presley's performance, Down Beat wrote: "Let it be noted that Elvis Presley's latest, King Creole, is his best picture thus far--comparatively speaking, of course. Maybe about 10 more films (and as many drama coaches) from now Elvis might begin to get an inkling of what acting's all about." TV-Radio Mirror magazine praised Presley's acting over his past roles: "Elvis Presley does his strongest acting job so far. Two years ago, Presley on the screen was a laughing stock.  But nobody is laughing now". Meanwhile, The Monthly Film Bulletin criticized the violence depicted in the film and rated the movie a III, denoting poor, stating, "This entangled series of cliches, each with more unlikely motivation than the last, provides the most unattractive Presley vehicle so far. His numbers only offer intermittent relief from the calculated violence and viciousness, and he can do little to balance the disagreeable movie".

Commonweal lamented the lack of punishment to the main character for his actions, but praised the director for his influence on Presley:

No doubt adults won't be moved much by "King Creole" one way or the other, but unfortunately teenage audiences may be taken in, especially since Danny is supposed to be a sympathetic character and at the end goes unpunished by the police for his crimes ... It must be said in favor of Director Michael Curtiz that he does succeed in getting Presley to act every now and then, but the cards are stacked in such an obvious manner against Danny that even Montgomery Clift couldn't have handled the role with conviction.

Catholic World commented:

Playing a part— an underprivileged youth who, on and off, displays some dignity and honest aspirations — that requires some histrionic effort, Presley shows signs that he is getting the hang of acting. The picture itself, however, after a promising enough beginning turns into a lurid melodramatic hash composed in about equal part of juvenile delinquency, gangsterism and sex. These may be legitimate dramatic subjects but the script gives them an illegitimate viewpoint and leaves muddled moral issues dangling.

The Florence Times wrote of Presley:

the fellow isn't a bad actor. Of course, he's nothing at all sensational and the Academy Award isn't in danger, but there are Hollywood habitues who've gotten by for years with less ability. In fact, given the normal amount of the more painstaking type of direction, it is entirely possible that Mr. Wiggle-hips could develop into a really competent actor. As long, however, as he can continue to attract audiences in present proportions there's little need in worrying with drama schools.

Allrovi rated the movie with four stars out of five, stating: "The film's highlight is a brief exchange of fisticuffs between Elvis and Walter Matthau. Together with Jailhouse Rock, King Creole is one of the best filmed examples of the untamed, pre-army Elvis Presley".

On Rotten Tomatoes, the film has an approval rating of 100% based on 23 reviews, with an average rating of 7.10/10.

Home media
The film was released on VHS by Paramount Pictures in 1986. In 2000, it was re-released on DVD with remastered sound and image, featuring the original theatrical trailer. On April 21, 2020, it was released on Blu-ray for the first time as part of the Paramount Presents label.

Soundtrack

See also
 List of American films of 1958
 List of films with a 100% rating on Rotten Tomatoes, a film review aggregation website
 List of hood films

References
Notes

Bibliography

External links
 
 
 

1958 films
1950s musical drama films
1950s teen films
American black-and-white films
American musical drama films
1950s English-language films
Films about singers
Films based on American novels
Films directed by Michael Curtiz
Films produced by Hal B. Wallis
Films scored by Walter Scharf
Films set in New Orleans
Films shot in New Orleans
1958 drama films
1950s American films